Makarand Deshpande (born 6 March 1966) is an Indian actor, writer, and director in Hindi, Kannada, Marathi, Telugu, Malayalam, Tamil cinema, and Indian Theatre. He is often seen in supporting and pivotal roles in various films like Jungle, Sarfarosh, Swades, Makdee, Bbuddah... Hoga Terra Baap and Darna Zaroori Hai where he often plays drunkard, wayfarer, and comic roles. He has directed over 5 films.

His contribution to the theatre industry includes over 50 short plays and 40 full-length plays, including Sir Sir Sirla, Joke, Maa In Transit, Krishna Kidding and Shakepearcha Mhatara. His recent play, Patni, with Niladri Kumar has been a hit across the country. His journey in theatre started in the year 1990 at Prithvi Theatre with support from Sanjana Kapoor. He started Ansh Theatre Group in the year 1993, along with Kay Kay Menon, who remains one of the pillars of the group.

Makarand Deshpande to be seen in upcoming romantic sports movie 'Liger', directed by Puri Jagannadh. The movie features Vijay Deverakonda, Ananya Panday, Ramya Krishnan, Ronit Roy.

Television
 Circus (1989)
 Devta as Suraj (1996)
 Filmi Chakkar as Papa Natekar (1994)
 Waqt Ki Raftaar
 Sailaab
 Sarabhai vs Sarabhai (season 1- guest appearance)
 Kyunki Saas Bhi Kabhi Bahu Thi as Vijay Saxena
 Vikram Betaal Ki Rahasya  Gatha (2018) (Betaal)
Maharashtracha Superstar 2 as Judge

Web series

Filmography

Director
Danav (2003)
Hanan (2004)
Shahrukh Bola Khoobsurat Hai Tu (2010)
Sona Spa (2013)
Saturday Sunday (Marathi) (2014)

Actor

Hindi

Qayamat Se Qayamat Tak (1988) (as Mac Deshpanday) as Baba
Salim Langde Pe Mat Ro (1989) as Peera
Prahaar: The Final Attack (1991) as Shirley's brother
Anth (1994) as Kali
Sir (1993) as Mak
Bedardi (1993) as Gulla,Goon
Pehla Nasha (1993)
Naajayaz (1995) as Street Singer
Naseem (1995) 
Fareb (1996)
Ghatak: Lethal (1996) as Punk (repeatedly slapped by Kashi)
Udaan (1997) (as Makarand Deshpande) as Masoombhai Dayachan
Satya (1998) (as Makarand Deshpande) as Advocate Chandrakant Mule
Sarfarosh (1999) as Shiva
Jungle (2000) as Dorai Swamy
Ghaath (2000) as Happy Singh
Ek Aur Visphot (2002) as Mun. Comm. Omkar Manav
Company (2002) as Narrator
Pyaar Diwana Hota Hai (2002) (as Makrandh Deshpandey) as Bhiku
Lal Salam (2002) as Rajayya
Road (2002) as Inderpal, Truck driver, sona spa
Makdee (2002) as Kallu, the village butcher
Market (2003) as Anthony Kaalia
Chameli (2003) as Taxi driver
Hanan (2004) as Surya
Paisa Vasool (2004)
Ek Se Badhkar Ek (2004) as  Krishnamurthy
Swades (2004) as Fakir
Khamosh... Khauff Ki Raat (2005) as Manas Dutta
Ek Khiladi Ek Haseena (2005) as Poker Player
Darna Zaroori Hai (2006) as Rahul
Yun Hota Toh Kya Hota (2006)
Guzaarish (2010)
Khatta Meeta (2010)
That Girl in Yellow Boots (2010) as Post Master
Bbuddah... Hoga Terra Baap (2011)
My Friend Pinto (2011) as Don
Kalpvriksh (2012)
Jackpot (2013)
Issaq (2013)
Abhinay Chakra (2014)
Hawaa Hawaai (2014)
Mogali Puvvu (2015)
Pratichhaya (2016)
Meri Beti Sunny Leone Banna Chaahti Hai (2017) as Father
Fukrey Returns (2017) as Father of the main character
The Wishing Tree (2017) as Sadho
Hanuman: Da' Damdaar (2017) as Voice of Vishrav
Game of Ayodhya (2017)
Mere Pyare Prime Minister (2019)
Junglee (2019)
Chicken Curry Law (2019)
Bombay Rose (2019)
Malang (2020) as Tony
Sadak 2 (2020) as Gyaan Prakash aka Guruji
Liger (2021)

12am(2021) as Rao
Shoorveer (2022)Bholaa (2023)

Marathi

Ek Ratra Mantarleli (1989)
 Rita (2009)
 Samaantar (2009)
 Ajintha (2012)
 Panhala (2015)
 Daagdi Chaawl (2015)
Mazhi Tapasya (2016) Baburao
 Truckbhar Swapna (2018)
Chatrapati Shasan 
 Aathva Rang Premacha (2021)
Dagadi Chawl 2 (2022)

Malayalam

No. 66 Madhura Bus    (2012)
Amen (2013) as Shevaliyar Pothachan
Bhaiyya Bhaiyya (2014) as Maoist Leader
Two Countries (2015) as Patelkar Ji
Pulimurugan (2016) as Ramaiyya
Kuttikalundu Sookshikkuka (2016)
Team 5 (2017)
Sayanna Varthakal (2022)
voice of Sathyanadhan  (2023)

Telugu

Jalsa (2008) as Naxalite
Ek Niranjan (2009) as Chidambaram
Mogali Puvvu
Bombhaat (2020) as Mad Scientist
Liger (2022)
Romantic (2021) as Samsun
RRR (2022) as Peddayya

Kannada

Dandupalya (2012) as Dandupalya Krishna
Aakramana (2014)
Abhinetri (2014)
Shivam (2014)
Dandupalya 2 (2017) as Krishna
Adyaksha in America (2019) as Seth

Tamil
Lisaa (2019)

Awards
South Indian International Movie Awards
Best Actor in a Negative Role for Dandupalya and No. 66 Madhura Bus

References

External links
Interview

Indian male screenwriters
Film directors from Maharashtra
Indian male television actors
Indian male film actors
20th-century Indian male actors
Male actors in Hindi cinema
Living people
1958 births
Indian male dramatists and playwrights
21st-century Indian male actors
People from Palghar district
21st-century Indian film directors
Hindi-language film directors
Marathi actors